Open edition may refer to:

 OpenEdition.org, an open access academic publishing portal of the Centre pour l'édition électronique ouverte, France
 OpenEdition MVS, an operating system component of UNIX System Services
 Open edition (printmaking), a printed edition of a publication limited only by the number that can be sold or produced before the plate wears out